Railway Stadium is a multi-propose ground in Dhanbad, Jharkhand. The ground has hosted Five first-class and T20 matches for Jharkhand cricket team till 2014.

Railway Stadium was also venue for football matches of national level. But now it is converted into Cricket Stadium by the Railway management. The stadium station had a seating capacity for 5,000. The plate group matches of Cooch Behar Trophy were also held here in 2008 besides some Under-22 fixtures of the BCCI in 2010. In 2012, the ground hosted match of Dhanbad Premier League a local T20 league based on the Indian Premier League.

I-League 2nd Division Matches

References

External links
 Dhanbad City 
 Dhanbad Portal
 Cricketarchive

Dhanbad
Cricket grounds in Jharkhand
Football venues in Jharkhand
Sports venues in Jharkhand
I-League 2nd Division venues
Sports venues completed in 2008
2008 establishments in Jharkhand